Elizabeth Lada is an American astronomer whose self-described research interests include "understanding the origin, properties, evolution and fate of young embedded clusters within molecular clouds".

The American Astronomical Society honored her work by awarding her the Annie J. Cannon Prize in 1992.  She also was named as a Hubble Fellow during her work at the University of Maryland. She was awarded a NSF CAREER award in 1999. In 1998 she received a Presidential Early Career Award for Scientists and Engineers (PECASE).

Life 
Lada received her Bachelor of Science in Physics degree from Yale University in 1983 and her Ph.D. in Astronomy from the University of Texas in 1990.  Lada is currently Professor of Astronomy at the University of Florida.

References

American women astronomers
Yale University alumni
University of Texas at Austin College of Natural Sciences alumni
University of Florida faculty
Hubble Fellows
Recipients of the Annie J. Cannon Award in Astronomy
Living people
Year of birth missing (living people)
Place of birth missing (living people)